"I'll Cast a Shadow" is a song by American heavy metal band Pantera from their 2000 album Reinventing the Steel, and is the final track on the album. The song is the final single to be released by the group before their breakup until their reformation in 2022, and also the last single to feature guitarist Dimebag Darrell and drummer Vinnie Paul before their deaths in 2004 and 2018 respectively. Is about the influence the band had on the heavy metal genre.

Reception
Metal Hammer ranked "I'll Cast a Shadow" No. 43 on their list of the 50 best Pantera songs, writing: "A grand and belligerent way for Pantera to bow out, this brooding paean to rising from the ashes  now seems unbearably poignant: 'When I die, I cast a shadow / And I'll rise, I cast a shadow'. For all their fire and fury, this band had the souls of poets, too."

Charts

References

2000 singles
Pantera songs
2000 songs
East West Records singles
Songs written by Dimebag Darrell
Songs written by Vinnie Paul
Songs written by Phil Anselmo
Songs written by Rex Brown